This is a list of notable individuals who were born or lived in Ljubljana:

Authors 
Anton Aškerc (1856–1912), poet
Vladimir Bartol (1903–1967), author
Adam Bohorič (1520–1598), Protestant preacher, author and philologist
Peter Božič (1932–2009), writer, playwright, journalist, and politician
Ivan Cankar (1876–1918), writer, playwright, and  essayist
Peter Čeferin (born 1938), attorney, writer, playwright
Aleš Debeljak (1961–2016), poet, essayist and sociologist
Anton Funtek (1862–1932), writer, poet, editor and translator
Alojz Gradnik (1882–1967), poet
Drago Jančar (born 1948), writer and essayist
Jože Javoršek (1920–1990), author, essayist, playwright and translator
Taras Kermauner, literary historian and essayist
Mile Klopčič (1905–1984), poet and translator
Edvard Kocbek (1904–1981), poet, essayist, writer and politician
Srečko Kosovel (1904–1926), poet
Ferdo Kozak (1894–1957), writer, playwright, and politician
Juš Kozak (1892–1964), writer
Primož Kozak (1929–1981), playwright and essayist
Taja Kramberger (born 1970), poet, essayist and anthropologist
Anton Tomaž Linhart (1756–1795), playwright and historian
Janez Menart (1929–2004), poet and translator
Josip Murn (1879–1901), poet 
Lili Novy (1885–1958), poet
Iztok Osojnik (born 1951), poet
Marko Pohlin (1735–1801), author, philologist
France Prešeren (1800–1849), poet
Alenka Puhar (born 1945), columnist, historian, political activist
Samo Resnik (1962–2011), Slovenian journalist, essayist, political activist, writer and poet
Tomaž Šalamun (born 1941), poet
Dominik Smole (1929–1992), writer and playwright
Bojan Štih (1923–1986), stage director, literary critic and essayist
Gregor Strniša (1930–1987), poet and playwright
Veno Taufer (born 1933), poet
Ivan Tavčar (1851–1923), writer, editor and politician
Igor Torkar (1913–2004), writer and playwright
Primož Trubar (1508–1586), Protestant preacher and writer 
Josip Vidmar (1895–1992), literary critic, essayist and politician
Anton Vodnik (1901–1956), poet, art historian, and critic
France Vodnik (1903–1986), literary critic, essayist, translator and poet 
Valentin Vodnik (1758–1819), poet
Dane Zajc (1929–2005), poet
Vitomil Zupan (1914–1987), writer
Oton Župančič (1872–1949), poet and playwright

Architects and visual artists 
Rihard Jakopič (1869–1943), painter
Ivana Kobilca (1861–1926), painter
Zoran Mušič (1909–2005), painter
Jože Plečnik (1872–1957), architect
Edvard Ravnikar (1907-1993), architect
Francesco Robba (1698–1757), Italian sculptor
Jakob Savinšek (1922–1961), sculptor
Vladimir Šubic (1894–1946), architect
 Damijan Stepančič (born 1969), Slovene painter and illustrator

Statesmen, politicians and diplomats 
Juro Adlešič (1884–1962), politician, Mayor of Ljubljana
Fran Albreht (1889–1963), Mayor of Ljubljana, poet
Andrej Bajuk (born 1942), Prime minister of Slovenia (2000)
Joze Brilej (1910–1981), politician, diplomat, ambassador, chief justice of the supreme court of Slovenia until his death
France Bučar (1923–2015), first Chairman of the Slovenian National Assembly (1990–1992)
Philipp von Cobenzl (1741–1810), Austrian diplomat
Etbin Henrik Costa (1831–1875), Politician, Mayor of Ljubljana
Karel Dežman (1821–1889), Mayor of Ljubljana, historian
Anton Füster (1808–1881), Austrian radical activist
Anastasius Grün (1806–1876), Austrian politician
Ivan Hribar (1851–1941), politician and diplomat, mayor of Ljubljana
Edvard Kardelj (1910–1979), Communist leader
Boris Kidrič (1912–1953), Communist leader
Ciril Kotnik (1895–1948), Yugoslav diplomat and anti-fascist hero
Milivoj Lajovic (1921–2008), Australian politician
Janez Potočnik (born 1958), European Commissioner
Ciril Ribičič (born 1947), politician, jurist, and author
Anton Rop (born 1960), politician
Dimitrij Rupel (born 1946), politician and writer
Marjan Šarec (born 1977), Slovene prime minister
Matjaž Šinkovec (born 1951), diplomat, author, translator and politician
Gregor Virant (born 1969), public servant and politician

Journalists 
Demetrio Volčič (born 1931), Slovenian-Italian journalist

Performing artists 
Bojan Adamič (1912–1995), composer, conductor, photographer
Maks Bajc (1919–1983), actor
Leo Funtek (1885–1965), violinist, conductor, arranger and music professor
Željko Ivanek (born 1957), actor
Lina Kuduzović (born 2002), child singer
Peter Lovšin (born 1955), rock icon, singer, writer
Ula Ložar (born 2002), child singer
Rocc (born 1979), opera director
Dubravka Tomšič Srebotnjak (born 1940), pianist and music teacher
Zlatko Šugman (1932–2008), actor 
DJ Umek (born 1976), deejay and music producer

Physicians 
Slavko Ziherl (1945–2012), psychiatrist

Religious leaders 
Sergiy Verigin (1868–1938), clergyman

Scientists and academics
Robert Blinc (born 1933), physicist
Katja Boh (1929–2008), sociologist, politician and diplomat
Miran Božovič (born 1957), philosopher
Božidar Debenjak (born 1935), philosopher
Mladen Dolar (born 1952), philosopher
Joannes Disma Floriantschitsch de Grienfeld (1691–1757), Carniolan astronomer, mathematician, geographer, and cartographer
Bogo Grafenauer (1916–1995), historian
Jovan Hadži (1884–1972), zoologist
Hermann Haus (1925–2003), scientist
Peter Jambrek (born 1940), jurist, sociologist, and public intellectual
Taras Kermauner (1930–2008), literary historian and essayist
Milan Komar (1921–2006), philosopher
Emil Korytko (1813–1839), Polish philologist and ethnographer
Milos Krofta (1912–2002), Slovenian engineer and businessman
Ernst Mally (1879–1944), philosopher
Vasilij Melik (1921–2009), historian
Tamara Griesser Pečar (born 1947), historian
Anton Peterlin (1908–1993), physicist
Fritz Pregl (1869–1930), chemist, Nobel prize winner
Janko Prunk (born 1942), historian
Rado Riha (born 1948), philosopher
Renata Salecl (born 1961), philosopher, sociologist, legal theorist and columnist
Vasko Simoniti (born 1951), historian
Marko Snoj (born 1959), linguist
Janez Strnad (born 1934), physicist and populariser of natural science
Gregor Tomc  (born 1952), sociologist and musician
Milan Vidmar (1885–1962), electrical engineer, chess player and philosopher
Josef Kalasanz von Erberg (1771–1843), botanist, historian, and collector
Johann Weikhard von Valvasor (1641–1693), scholar, polymath, member of the Royal Society
Egon Zakrajšek (1941–2002), mathematician and computer scientist 
Slavoj Žižek (born 1949), sociologist and philosopher
Sigismund Zois (1747–1819), natural scientist
Alenka Zupančič, philosopher

Athletes 
 Milenko Ačimovič, football player
Pia Babnik (born 2004), golfer
 Alenka Bikar, track and field
 Brigita Bukovec, track and field
 Miro Cerar, gymnast
 Boštjan Cesar, football player
 Ivo Daneu, basketball player
 Luka Dončić, NBA basketball player for the Dallas Mavericks
 Goran Dragić (born 1986), NBA basketball player for the Milwaukee Bucks
 Zoran Dragić, NBA basketball player
 Marko Elsner, football player
 Luka Gregorc (born 1984), ATP tennis player
 Samir Handanović, football player
 Urška Hrovat (born 1974), alpine skier
 Tomaz Humar (1969–2009), mountaineer
 Srečko Katanec (1981–1994), football player
 Jaka Lakovič, basketball player
 Zlatan Ljubijankič, football player
 Erazem Lorbek, basketball player
 Maksimilijan Mihelčič, football player
 Radoslav Nesterovič (born 1976), NBA basketball player
 Džoni Novak, football player
 Milivoje Novakovič, football player
 Brane Oblak (1965–1985), football player
 Jan Oblak, football player
 Aljaž Pegan, gymnast
 Janez Perme (born 1982), retired Slovenian footballer
 Mitja Petkovšek, gymnast
 Rok Petrovič (1966–1993), alpine skier
 Mateja Svet (born 1968), alpine skier
 Andraž Šporar, football player
 Jurij Tepeš, ski jumper
 Miran Tepeš, ski jumper
 Sašo Udovič, football player
 Primož Ulaga, ski jumper
 Haris Vučkić, football player
 Aljoša Žorga, basketball player
 Petra Majdic, nordic skier
 Kaja Juvan, tennis player

People who lived in Ljubljana temporarily
Miodrag Bulatović (born 1930), Serb-Montenegrin writer
Carlos, Duke of Madrid (1848–1909), claimant to the Spanish throne (born in Ljubljana)
Eugène de Beauharnais (1781–1824), Viceroy of Italy
Gabriel Gruber (1740–1805), Austrian Jesuit and engineer
Emil Korytko (1813–1839), Polish ethnographer, philologist and translator
Gustav Mahler (1860–1911), Austrian composer
Charles Nodier (1780–1844), French author
Joseph Radetzky (1766–1858), Austrian general

References

 
People
Ljubliana
Ljubljana